The Royal British Legion Band & Corps of Drums Romford are a marching band based in Romford, Essex. The band are celebrating their Platinum Jubilee in 2022.

The Band was founded in 1952 by Mr Peter Richardson BEM and is one of the longest running independent youth bands in this country today, membership is usually 70+. They were the first youth band to appear at the Edinburgh Military Tattoo and have performed alongside almost every band of Her Majesty's Armed Forces at many different military events both in the UK and abroad.

External links
 Official site

English marching bands
Musical groups established in 1952
Romford
1952 establishments in England
Musical groups from the London Borough of Havering